The Market NYC is a designer and vintage goods flea market with outlets in several locations in New York City. The market has two locations: one at 290 Mulberry Street in Nolita, Manhattan and another at 218 Bedford Avenue in the Williamsburg neighborhood of Brooklyn.

History
The Market NYC was founded in 2002, when a small group of designers and artists, including the Alex Pabon and Nicolas Petrou, were looking for a location in New York City to sell their goods, rather than do so on a consignment basis in boutiques, or on open day at Henri Bendel – where lines of designers waited outside for hours to have a chance to sell.  They came up with the idea for a market where young and upcoming designers could sell their creations with the least financial risk, could test the market, and learn the business without having to commit to a long-term lease. The ability to get feedback from their clientele was another important consideration.

In 2012, The Market NYC moved from its original Nolita location to a new location at 159 Bleecker Street, next to the rock club The Bitter End.  The new location, a historic building dating from 1917, once housed the Circle in the Square Theatre. In 2015, The Market NYC opened a Brooklyn branch in Wiliamsburg at 218 Bedford Avenue. In 2016, The Market NYC opened another new location in Nolita at 290 Mulberry Street.

References
Notes

External links

Flea markets
Shops in New York City
Greenwich Village
Commercial buildings in Manhattan
Commercial buildings in Brooklyn